This is a list of urban agglomerations with a population above 100,000 as per 2011 census and development ranking in Punjab and Chandigarh.

Punjab

Chandigarh

Urban Agglomeration
In the census of India 2011, an Urban Agglomeration has been defined as follows:

"An urban agglomeration is a continuous urban spread constituting a town and its adjoining outgrowths (OGs), or two or more physically contiguous towns together with or without outgrowths of such towns. An Urban Agglomeration must consist of at least a statutory town and its total population (i.e. all the constituents put together) should not be less than 20,000 as per the 2001 Census. In varying local conditions, there were similar other combinations which have been treated
as urban agglomerations satisfying the basic condition of contiguity."

Constituents of Urban Agglomerations in the Punjab and Chandigarh
The constituents of Urban Agglomerations in the Punjab and Chandigarh, with a population of 1 lakh or above, are noted below:

Amritsar Urban Agglomeration includes Amritsar (M Corp.), Nangli (CT), Mudal (CT), Bara Khankot Doburjee (OG), Village Mule Chak (OG), Abadi Baba Darshan Singh on Ram Tirath Road (OG), Abadi Baba Jiwan Singh on Ram Tirath Road (OG), Abadi along Khairabad on Ram Tirath Road to Ajnala Road (OG), Village Roriwala (OG), Prem Nagar on Ajnala Road (OG), Abadi Mirankot on Ajnala Road (OG), Gumtala Colony on Jagdev Kalan Road (OG), Ranjit Vihar (OG), Naushera Khurd (OG), Parti Vihar (OG), Abadi Naushera (OG), Silver Estate (OG), Krishna Lane (OG), Vill Bhagatpura( Factories on right side of Doburjee G.T Road ) (OG), Abadi Khalsa Nagar near Kot Mit Singh (OG), Village Kuriwal (OG), Thandewala (OG), Basarka Bhaini (Attari Road) (OG), Village Ghumanpura (OG), Joshi Colony, Ram Tirath Road (OG), Raggar Colony, Gali No. 1,2 & 3, and Ram Tirath Road (OG).
Jalandhar UA includes Jalandhar (M Corp.), Khambra (CT), Alipur adjacent to Village Mithapur (OG), Nangal Karkhan adjacent to Master Mehnga Singh Colony (OG) and Bidhipur on Amritsar Road (OG).
Patiala UA includes Patiala (M Corp.), Ranjit Nagar Extension- 1 (OG), Grid Colony PSEB on Bhadson Road (OG), Kheri Gujran (OG), Urban Estate- I (OG), Punjabi University (OG), Urban Estate- II (OG) and Ranjit Nagar Extension- II (OG).
Mohali UA includes Mohali (M Corp.), Sector - 66 (OG), Sector - 67 (OG), Sector - 68 (OG), Sector - 69 (OG) and Sohana (CT).
Batala UA includes Batala (M Cl), Bhode- di- Khui (OG) and Kharal (OG).
Pathankot UA includes Pathankot (M Corp.), Khanpur(OG), Lamin (OG) and Dhaki (CT).
Moga UA includes Moga (M Corp.), Landeke (Amritsar Road) (OG) and Duneke (Firozpur Road) (OG).
Phagwara UA includes Phagwara (M Corp.) and Phagwara Sharki (CT).
Chandigarh Urban Agglomeration includes Chandigarh (M Corp.), Khuda Jassu (OG), Lahora (OG), Khuda Alisher (CT), Mani Majra (R), Basti Kishangarh, Basti Bhagwanpura (CT), Daria (CT), Mauli Jagran (CT) and Behlana (CT).

Abbreviations: M Corp. = Municipal Corporation, M = Municipality, CT = Census Town, OG = Out Growth, NA = Notified Area, CB = Cantonment Board

Urban Agglomeration constituents
Urban Agglomerations constituents with a population above 100,000 as per 2011 census are shown in the table below.

See also 

 List of cities in Punjab, Pakistan by population

References

 
Cities
Punjab